Vaidas is a Lithuanian masculine given name. It is often a diminutive of the name Vaidotas. People with the name Vaidas include:
Vaidas Baumila (born 1987), Lithuanian singer and actor
Vaidas Čepukaitis (born 1989), Lithuanian basketball player 
Vaidas Kariniauskas (born 1993), Lithuanian basketball
Vaidas Mizeras (born 1973), Lithuanian sprint canoer and Olympic competitor 
Vaidas Sakalauskas (born 1971), Lithuanian chess International Master
Vaidas Šilėnas (born 1985), Lithuanian footballer
Vaidas Slavickas (born 1986), Lithuanian footballer 
Vaidas Žutautas (born 1973), Lithuanian footballer and football manager

See also
 

Lithuanian masculine given names